Lehr is a surname. Notable people with the surname include:

Anna Lehr, American silent film actress
Clarence Lehr (1886–1948), American baseball player
Devon Lehr, American television writer and screenwriter
George W. Lehr (1937–1988), American politician from Missouri
Henry Solomon Lehr (1838–1923), American educator, founder of Ohio Northern University
Henry Symes Lehr (1869–1929), American socialite
John Lehr (born 1967), American actor
John Lehr (photographer) (born 1975), American photographer
John C. Lehr (1878–1958), American politician, U.S. Representative from Michigan
Justin Lehr (born 1977), American baseball pitcher
Lew Lehr (1895–1950) American comedian, writer and editor
Marguerite Lehr (1898–1987), American mathematician 
Matt Lehr (born 1979), American football player
Robert Lehr (1883–1956), German politician
Stanford Lehr (1912–1992), American politician, member of the Pennsylvania House of Representatives
Ursula Lehr (1930–2022), German gerolontogist and politician
Zella Lehr, American singer and entertainer
Dylan Lehr, American rapper and songwriter

German-language surnames
Jewish surnames
Yiddish-language surnames